Raymond Peter "Walt" McGaw (December 27, 1899 – October 8, 1979) was a guard in the National Football League (NFL). He was a member of the Green Bay Packers during the 1926 NFL season.

References

Sportspeople from Rockford, Illinois
Green Bay Packers players
American football offensive guards
Beloit Buccaneers football players
1899 births
1979 deaths
Players of American football from Illinois